Zeta Tau Alpha (known as  or Zeta) is an international women's fraternity founded on October 15, 1898 at the State Female Normal School (now Longwood University) in Farmville, Virginia. Its International Office is located in Carmel, Indiana. It is a member of the National Panhellenic Conference and currently has more than 257,000 initiated members.

History
This women's fraternity was founded by nine women on October 15, 1898 at the State Female Normal School (now Longwood University) in Farmville, Virginia. ZTA is the third organization founded of the "Farmville Four." In order, these are: Kappa Delta (1897), Sigma Sigma Sigma (1898), Zeta Tau Alpha (1898), and Alpha Sigma Alpha (1901).

's nine founders were: Maud Jones Horner, Della Lewis Hundley, Alice Bland Coleman, Mary Campbell Jones Batte, Alice Grey Welsh, Ethel Coleman Van Name, Helen May Crafford, Frances Yancey Smith, and Ruby Leigh Orgain. In 1897, the founders began meeting to form an organization during their time at the Normal to cement the bonds of their friend group, which at the time, numbered at "a dozen." When Alice Bland Coleman was approached by another women's fraternity on campus to join, the founders pushed forward with starting the fraternity. Maud Jones Horner and Frances Yancey Smith then turned to their respective brothers, Plummer Jones (Kappa Alpha and Phi Beta Kappa) and Giles Mebane Smith (Phi Theta Psi and Phi Beta Kappa), as resources of information regarding the fraternity system. At this time, the fraternity went by its original moniker, "???" (pronounced "Who, Who, Who?") which was used during its first interactions with the two other women's fraternities at Longwood. It would not be until the spring of 1899 that the Greek letter name, "Zeta Tau Alpha", would be officially decided upon.

With this development,  was "the first of the Farmville Four to be chartered and the first women's fraternity to be granted a charter by a special act of the legislature."

1903, the first national convention was held in Farmville and it was here that the name of the fraternity's official publication Themis was decided. It was also at this convention that Zeta Tau Alpha officially adopted the term "fraternity" instead of "sorority" to distinguish the organization from those directly affiliated with men's fraternities.

In 1909, the organization joined the National Panhellenic Conference (NPC), an umbrella organization consisting of women's fraternities and sororities, in order to expand. This resulted in the first closure of its Alpha chapter at Longwood University.

In 1954, Zeta Tau Alpha established the Zeta Tau Alpha Foundation. The ZTA Foundation is a non-profit organization devoted to funding scholarships for sisters, providing educational programming, and supporting the national philanthropy of ZTA which is breast cancer education and awareness.

In 1974, Zeta Tau Alpha Housing Corporation was founded. The organization serves to manage official ZTA facilities used by its chapters.

In 2021, as a result of ongoing efforts to improve diversity, equity, inclusion in ZTA, national council officially eliminated the Legacy Policy as a factor in membership selection. Previously, a legacy was given preferential consideration during recruitment. As part of its official announcement, the fraternity released a statement saying "Removing the Legacy Policy is an important step toward providing a more equitable recruitment experience for all potential new members. It allows collegiate chapters and PNMs to focus on the mutual selection process, gives chapters full accountability for the members they select, and will ensure that non-legacy PNMs have the same access and opportunity to join."

Philanthropy
In 1928, Zeta Tau Alpha started its first national philanthropic effort in the creation of a health center servicing the community of Currin County, Virginia, located in Appalachia. When the health center closed in 1946,  partnered with the Easterseals until 1970 and the ARC until 1992. During the partnership with the Easter Seals, the Zeta Tau Alpha Foundation (known as the  Foundation) was established in 1954.

In 1992,  adopted breast cancer education and awareness as its national philanthropy and partnered with the Susan G. Komen Breast Cancer Foundation until 2015. In 2010, Zeta Tau Alpha trademarked the phrase "Think Pink" with the United States Patent and Trademark Office. Since then, this term has become the umbrella theme for all of their breast cancer education and awareness projects.

The  Foundation currently has partnerships with the American Cancer Society, in which the Foundation is the National Survivor Ambassador of Making Strides Against Breast Cancer; the National Football League (partnership established in 1999), for which the Foundation distributes pink ribbons as part of the NFL's "A Crucial Catch" campaign; and Bright Pink, in which the Brighten Up Educational Workshop is brought to each collegiate chapter's campus to provide to tools for assessing breast cancer risk.

Programming 
The  Foundation also develops programming geared towards college students covering topics such as mental health, substance abuse, and leadership development. Such programs are referred to My Sister, My Responsibility and contain content emphasizing social responsibility, duty of care, and engaging conversations about risk. 

ZTA is also a member of the Harm Reduction Alliance, a group which collaborates on providing programming to college students. The Harm Reduction Alliance has generated programming such as Generation Rx, targeted towards drug use in college-aged individuals, and a partnership with ActiveMinds to help facilitate conversations around mental health within their chapters.

In response to the COVID-19 Pandemic, the ZTA Foundation provided "Grace Grants" to members of ZTA experiencing hardship. "Grace" refers both to the act of grace given to each other as members and to Grace Estelle Elcan, one of the fraternity's first new members.

Chapter officers for both collegiate and alumnae groups are also given leadership training by ZTA. Chapter officers are able to attend either the Emerging Leaders Academy and/or the Officers' Leadership Academy which allow members to learn more about their specific officer roles.

Symbols & Insignia

Official Jewelry

Official Badge 
Designed with the help of Mebane Smith, Maud Jones Horner, Frances Yancey Smith, and Mary Campbell Jones Batte chose the final design. The size was regulated at the 1912 convention to be modeled after that of Dr. May Agnes Hopkins, ZTA's national president at the time. Members may wear attach a chapter guard and attach dangles to denote achievements and positions held as a ZTA. The chapter guard is the only pin allowed to be attached to the badge and the badge may not be turned into jewelry and may not be set with more than 2 stones. ZTA has no official jewel or gemstone.

New Member Badge 
New members may wear a turquoise and silver carpenter square pin, which was adopted in the 1910 National Convention. The new member pin is returned upon initiation.

Recognition Pin 
Members may also wear a recognition pin in the shape of a small, gold five-pointed crown on their coat as the badge. "While not a rule," it was deemed that it was "a matter of good taste" that a member never wear the official badge on a coat.

Honor Ring 
In recognition of outstanding service to the Fraternity, members can receive an Honor Ring which bears the coat of arms on a turquoise stone. Adopted at the 1915 National Convention, the oblong-octagonal ring also bears an open book and five-pointed crown in relief on the sides. It is considered 's highest individual honor for alumnae.

Anniversary Jewelry 
For major anniversaries, members receive additional pins and charms to commemorate 25, 50, and 75 years as a Zeta. 25-Year members receive the 25-Year Pin, 50-Year members receive the White Violet Pin, and 75-Year Members receive a White Violet Charm.

Insignia

Coat of Arms 
The Coat of Arms in use today was adopted in 1926 and follows heraldic rules. It is described as: "Quarterly argent and azure; in two and three a cinquefoil of the first; nine billets in bend sable. Crest:  Above a crown (radiate) or, a chain of five links fess-wise argent. Motto: Zeta Tau Alpha in Greek upper and lower case." Only initiated members may use the crest in any manner, which must be dignified and in good taste. The secret, ritualistic meaning of the Coat of Arms is revealed to each member during her Initiation.

Banner 
The Banner was introduced at the 1910 National Convention and was made by Bertha Cruse Gardner as a commission from the National President. The turquoise and gray satin banner bears the letter "A", the Greek word "Themis" and a burning torch. The banner's meaning is secret, but it may be hung in a visible place in chapter housing.

Colors 
Members also wear the colors in honor of significant events such as the installation of a new  chapter, Founder's Day celebrations, or the death of a member. The significance of these colors is explained in the Initiation Service.

Flower 
While the specific of varietal of violet is not named, depictions of the flower show that it is based on the Viola canadensis which is native to Virginia.

Symbols 
The five-pointed crown is the primary official symbol of the fraternity. The meaning of the crown is revealed to members during the initiation service and members may use either the official logo crown or the crown used on the Coat of Arms. The strawberry is also used as a secondary symbol. The strawberry's significance came to be when Mary Campbell Jones Batte was gifted a basket of strawberries from an admirer. Through that gift, the founders resolved to host their first social gathering and become recognized on campus.

Themis

Patron Goddess 
In addition, the founders chose Themis as their patron goddess to represent the fraternity. In Greek tradition, Themis represents "divine justice" and was seated beside Zeus to give counsel and gather assemblies. She also served as an Oracle of Delphi. In addition to being a wife of Zeus, she was the daughter of Uranus and Gaea and the mother of the Horae and the Moirai. In some depictions, she is the mother of Prometheus. She is often depicted holding a sword of justice and the scales of law.

Official Publication 
Themis is also the name of 's official publication. Adopted in the 1903 National Convention, the award-winning publication regularly features collegiate and alumnae chapter news, photos and achievements. Originally provided as a newspaper, Themis is now a quarterly magazine sent out to all members of ZTA.

The Creed of Zeta Tau Alpha 
Written by Shirley Kreasan Strout and adopted at the 1928 National Convention, the Creed of Zeta Tau Alpha is the embodiment of the organization's values. Per tradition, every chapter meeting of Zeta Tau Alpha opens with members reciting the Creed together.To realize that within our grasp, in Zeta Tau Alpha, lies the opportunity to learn those things which will ever enrich and ennoble our lives; to be true to ourselves, and to those within and without our circle; 

To think in terms of all mankind and our service in the world; 

To be steadfast, strong, and clean of heart and mind, remembering that since the thought is father to the deed, only that which we would have manifested in our experience should be entertained in thought; 

To find satisfaction in being, rather than seeming, thus strengthening in us the higher qualities of the spirit; 

To prepare for service and learn the nobility of serving, thereby earning the right to be served; to seek understanding that we might gain true wisdom; to look for the good in everyone; 

To see beauty, with its enriching influence; to be humble in success, and without bitterness in defeat; 

To have the welfare and harmony of the Fraternity at heart, striving ever to make our lives a symphony of high ideals, devotion to the Right, the Good, and the True, without a discordant note; remembering always that the foundation precept of Zeta Tau Alpha was Love, "the greatest of all things". - Shirley Kreasan StroutThe Creed was the basis for establishing "The Nine Key Values" of Zeta Tau Alpha, which are:

 Lifelong Learning
 Leadership
 Responsibility
 Being Rather than Seeming
 Service & Philanthropy
 Seeking Understanding that We Might Gain True Wisdom
 Humility
 Loyalty & Commitment
 Love

Membership

Chapters 

Zeta Tau Alpha has 174 active collegiate chapters and 233 active alumnae chapters. There are alumnae chapters across the United States, Canada and a virtual alumnae chapter, ZTAlways. ZTAlways is a virtual alumnae chapter for members who do not have the opportunity to interact with sisters among a land-based chapter. As an alumna, a woman is still considered a member of ZTA. The Epsilon chapter at the University of Arkansas is the longest standing ZTA chapter in the world.

Fraternity operations
Zeta Tau Alpha is structured into three separate organizations which facilitate fraternity operations: Zeta Tau Alpha Fraternity, Zeta Tau Alpha Housing Corporation, and Zeta Tau Alpha Foundation. These organizations are each supported by volunteers working at the local and national level as well as staff based at the International Office, based in Carmel, Indiana. The ZTA Foundation also provides Leadership Consultants to help provide direct national support for chapters during major events and for leadership development.

Notable members

Arts/entertainment 

 Sarah Rose Summers (Gamma Psi) - Miss USA 2018
 Dr. Ellen Taaffe Zwilich (Beta Gamma) – First woman to win the Pulitzer Prize in music and receive a doctorate in music composition from Juilliard
 Betty Buckley (Gamma Psi) – Tony Award winning theater, film, and television actress (Cats, Eight is Enough, Tender Mercies)
 Phyllis George (Gamma Phi) – Miss America 1971, Emmy Award winning television host, network television's first woman sportscaster, author, former First Lady of Kentucky
 Nicole Paggi (Theta Psi) – Actress
 MerrieBeth Cox (Alpha Theta) – 2012 Miss Indiana; finalist in 2013 Miss America pageant.
 Brittany Toll (Beta Nu) – Former Miss New Mexico USA, top 16 finalist at Miss USA, and "Fan Favorite" and former Miss New Mexico Teen USA
Tiffany Maher (Eta Kappa) – Female runner-up on U.S. Season 9 of So You Think You Can Dance

Sports 

 Maddie Gardner (Theta Tau) – 2 time gold medalist at the All-Star Cheerleading World Championship
 Ryan Carlyle (Beta Omicron) - Member of the first-ever U.S. Women's Rugby Sevens Team at the 2016 Rio Olympics
 Sarah Patterson (Nu) - Former Head Coach of the Alabama Crimson Tide women's gymnastics team; Inducted into Alabama's Sports Hall of Fame

Philanthropy 

 Shonda Schilling (Iota Delta) – Founder of the Curt and Shonda Schilling Melanoma Foundation of America, author, wife of Boston Red Sox pitcher Curt Schilling

Journalism 

 Faith Daniels (Theta) – News personality (48 Hours, Sunday Morning, The Today Show, CBS Morning News)
 Susan Elizabeth Ford Bales (Alpha Upsilon) –  Photojournalist; Daughter of President Gerald Ford, spokesperson for National Breast Cancer Awareness Month, former chair of the board of the Betty Ford Center
 Erin Andrews (Gamma Iota) – ESPN reporter and host of Fox College Football for Fox Sports
 Betty Nguyen (Kappa) – CNN journalist, anchor for CBS Morning News and contributor for The Early Show
Laura Rutledge (Gamma Iota) – Co-host of "SEC Nation" on the SEC Network; 2012 Miss Florida; finalist in 2013 Miss America pageant
 Heather O'Rourke (Theta Xi) - News Personality - WABC-TV New York City

Military 

 Brigadier General Margaret A. Brewer, U.S.M.C. (Alpha Gamma) – First woman general officer of the United States Marine Corps

Politics 

 Virginia Shehee (Beta Iota) – Member of the Louisiana State Senate, 1976–1980; Shreveport businesswoman and philanthropist
 Lynda Bird Johnson Robb (Kappa) – Former First Lady of Virginia; Former Chairwoman of the Presidents Advisory Committee for Women; Daughter of President Lyndon B. Johnson, wife of Charles Robb
 Cheri Daniels (Alpha Xi) – Wife of former Governor of Indiana Mitch Daniels
 Deborah Platt Majoras (Delta Omega) – Former chairman of the Federal Trade Commission, chief legal officer and Secretary of Procter and Gamble

References

External links
 

 
1898 establishments in Virginia
Student societies in the United States
National Panhellenic Conference
Fraternities and sororities based in Indianapolis
Student organizations established in 1898
Longwood University